Manuyo Uno station is an optional proposed stop on the Manila Light Rail Transit System Line 1. It is part of the Line 1 South Extension Project. The station would be located on Villareal Street corner C-5 Extension in Las Piñas.

Line 1 plan calls for an almost entirely elevated extension of approximately 11.7 km. The extension will have 8 passenger stations, with an option for 2 future stations (Manuyo Uno and Talaba), all intended to be constructed above-ground.

The station is named after its proposed location in Barangay Manuyo Uno along C-5 Extension in Las Piñas.  It is one of two proposed Line 1 stations in Las Piñas and the other being Las Piñas station.

, the project is  61.60% complete. The extension is slated for partial operations by late 2024 or early 2025 and full operations by second quarter of 2027.

See also
List of Manila LRT and MRT stations
Manila Light Rail Transit System

References

Manila Light Rail Transit System stations
Proposed railway stations in the Philippines